Sankt Georgen bei Obernberg am Inn is a municipality in the district of Ried im Innkreis in the Austrian state of Upper Austria.

Geography
Sankt Georgen lies in the Innviertel. About 6 percent of the municipality is forest, and 86 percent is farmland.

References

Cities and towns in Ried im Innkreis District